Leezah Sun (born ) is an American politician and activist. She is a Democratic member of the Arizona House of Representatives elected to represent District 22 in 2022.

Life 
Sun was born  in Jeju City, South Korea to Chinese refugees. In 1977, Sun and her family moved to Michigan.

Sun worked in the pharmaceutical industry on the East Coast of the United States. She moved to Arizona in 2005 and started a family. She was a stay at home mom. Sun was motivated to volunteer with the American Civil Liberties Union of Arizona and the Demand to Learn campaign after her 8 year old son was denied access to gifted educational programs. She registered to vote in 2018. She ran in the 2020 Arizona House of Representatives election and ultimately lost to two incumbents. After the election, she was appointed vice chair of the central region of the Arizona Asian American Pacific Islander Democratic Caucus.

During the 2022 Arizona House of Representatives election, Sun was elected to represent District 22.

References

External links 

 
 Biography at Ballotpedia

Democratic Party members of the Arizona House of Representatives
Living people
Year of birth missing (living people)
21st-century American women politicians
Women state legislators in Arizona
21st-century American politicians
American women of Chinese descent in politics
Asian-American state legislators in Illinois
People from Jeju Province
Chinese emigrants to the United States
Asian-American people in Arizona politics
American women activists
Activists from Arizona
Activists from Michigan